Crepis czerepanovii is a species of flowering plant belonging to the family Asteraceae.

Its native range is Finland and northwestern European Russia.

References

czerepanovii
Flora of Finland
Flora of Northwest European Russia
Plants described in 1996